Wadsworth Mansion may refer to:

Wadsworth Mansion at Long Hill, Connecticut, USA
Wadsworth Mansion (band), a rock band